Xeroderma, xerosis or xerosis cutis, or simply dry skin, is a skin condition characterized by excessively dry skin.[1]

The medical term xeroderma, meaning "dry skin", derives from modern Latin, xero- 'dry' + Greek derma 'skin'.

In most cases, dry skin can safely be treated with emollients or moisturizers. Xeroderma occurs most commonly on the scalp, lower legs, arms, hands, knuckles, the sides of the abdomen, and thighs. Symptoms most associated with xeroderma are such skin conditions as scaling (the visible peeling of the outer skin layer), itching, and skin fissures (cracked skin).[2]

Causes

Xeroderma is a very common condition. It happens more often in the winter when the cold air outside and the hot air inside create a low relative humidity. This causes the skin to lose moisture and it may crack and peel. Bathing or hand washing too frequently, especially if one is using harsh soaps, can contribute to xeroderma. Xeroderma can be caused by a deficiency of vitamin A, vitamin D, zinc, systemic illness, severe sunburn, or some medication. Xeroderma can be caused by choline inhibitors. Detergents such as washing powder and dishwashing liquid can cause xeroderma.

Prevention
Today, many creams and lotions, commonly based on vegetable oils/butters, petroleum oils/jellies, and lanolin are widely available. As a preventive measure, such products may be rubbed onto the affected area as needed (often every other day) to prevent dry skin. The skin is then patted dry to prevent the removal of natural lipids from the skin. Taking a shower or washing hands with special moisturizing soaps or body washes can protect the skin from drying out further.

Treatment
Repeated application (typically over a few days) of emollients or skin lotions/creams to the affected area will likely result in quick alleviation of xeroderma. In particular, the application of highly occlusive barriers to moisture, such as petrolatum, vegetable oils/butters, and mineral oil have been shown to provide excellent results.  Many individuals find specific commercial skin creams and lotions (often comprising oils, butters, and or waxes emulsified in water) quite effective (although individual preferences and results vary among the wide array of commercially available creams).

Lanolin, a natural mixture of lipids derived from sheep's wool, helps replace natural lipids in human skin and has been used since ancient times (and in modern medicine) as among the most powerful treatments for xeroderma. Some people may, however, have allergies to lanolin, producing the opposite of the desired effect. Also, pure lanolin is a thick waxy substance which, for many individuals, proves difficult and inconvenient for general use on dry skin (especially over large areas of the body).  As a result, many formulated lanolin products, having a softer consistency than pure lanolin, are available.

Safety
Many skin creams include common allergens such as fragrances, parabens, and lanolin.

See also
 Eczema
 Ichthyosis
 Xeroderma pigmentosum

References

External links

Dermatologic terminology
Skin